The Central Sierra Field Research Stations—CSFRS  is a regional group of University of California, Berkeley field research & education reserves located on both sides of the crest of the Sierra Nevada range, north of Lake Tahoe in California.

Several of the University of California Natural Reserve System—UCNRS reserves in the Central Sierra Field Research Stations—CSFRS lie within the headwaters of the North Fork of the American River.

History

Field research stations & education reserves
Central Sierra Field Research Stations—CSFRS entities include:

 Sagehen Creek Field Station
 Central Sierra Snow Laboratory
 Onion Creek Experimental Watershed
 North Fork Association Lands
 Chickering American River Reserve

Sagehen Creek Field Station serves as the hub of this network, offering accessible accommodations, classrooms, support and resources — which are unavailable at the other, sometimes remote CSFRS reserves.

Digital elevation models & other GIS datasets for the CSFRS are available.

Contacts
For information regarding research & education access to the CSFRS reserves, publications, theses, and additional data — please contact the individual Reserve Managers through their web-sites (when available), or contact the Station Manager at Sagehen Creek Field Station.

References

Sagehen Creek Field Station.
Central Sierra Snow Lab
Onion Creek Experimental Watershed
Chickering American Reserve 
Berkeley Natural History Museums
Berkeley Office of the Vice Chancellor for Research
California Biodiversity Center
Pacific Southwest Research Station
Tahoe National Forest
Sagehen Experimental Forest

External links
 Official Central Sierra Field Research Stations—CSFRS website

University of California Natural Reserve System
Tahoe National Forest
Protected areas of the Sierra Nevada (United States)
University of California, Berkeley
Research stations